Artuma Fursi is a district located in the Oromia Zone of the Amhara region of Ethiopia. Artuma Fursi is bordered on the south by Jilee Dhummuugaa, on the west by the Semien Shewa Zone, on the northwest by Dawa Chaffa, on the north by Dawa Harewa, and on the east by the Afar Region. Towns in Artuma Fursi include Chaffa Robit. Artuma Fursi was part of the former Artuma Fursi Jilee woreda.

Demographics
Based on the 2007 national census conducted by the Central Statistical Agency of Ethiopia (CSA), this woreda has a total population of 82,842, of whom 40,938 are men and 41,904 women; 5,941 or 7.17% are urban inhabitants. The majority of the inhabitants were Muslim, with 97.76% reporting that as their religion, while 1.81% of the population said they practiced Ethiopian Orthodox Christianity.

Notes

Districts of Amhara Region